The 1956 Singapore Open, also known as the 1956 Singapore Badminton Championships, took place from 17 October – 14 December 1956 at the Singapore Badminton Hall in Singapore. The ties were played over a few months with the first round ties being played on the 17th of October and the finals on the 14th of December. The women's singles final was played on 11 November while the mixed doubles final was played on the 14th of November.

Venue
Singapore Badminton Hall

Final results

References 

Singapore Open (badminton)
1956 in badminton